Loen Skylift is an aerial tramway in Loen in Stryn, Norway. The cable car climbs  to the top of Mount Hoven, above the Nordfjord. With a gradient up to 60°, it is one of the steepest in the world. The average is 45°. It is the first aerial tramway installed in Norway since Hangursbanen in 1963.

Loen Skylift is owned and run by Loen SkyliftAS, where Hotel Alexandra, Doppelmayr Garaventa Group and Stryn Municipality are the largest shareholders.

The owners expected some 55,000 visitors during 2017, while by the end of 2017 the skylift had transported 92,000 passengers. Local business in Loen village recorded an 80% increase in revenues after the skylift opened.

History
The building process started in 2015, and it was inaugurated by Her Majesty Queen Sonja of Norway on 20 May 2017. The costs of the construction work total 300 million NOK.

The top station served as a venue for the debate on nationale TV during the 2017 campaign.

References

External links 
 Official Website
 USA Today: The Worlds 10 best cable cars
 Doppelmayr: 45-ATW Loen Skylift

Cable cars in Norway
2017 establishments in Norway